This is a recap of the 1963 season for the Professional Bowlers Association (PBA) Tour.  It was the tour's fifth season, and consisted of 37 events. 22-year old Billy Hardwick won four titles on the season, including the fourth PBA National Championship, en route to winning the inaugural Sporting News PBA Player of the Year award.  Through the 2022 PBA Tour season, Hardwick is still the youngest player to ever win this award.

Tournament schedule

References

External links
1963 Season Schedule

Professional Bowlers Association seasons
1963 in bowling